Paul Dupuis (August 11, 1913 – January 23, 1976) was a French Canadian film actor who was born in Montreal, Quebec, Canada, and who performed in British films during the late 1940s. The roles he played were mainly as the romantic leading man. He died in Saint-Sauveur in Quebec.

His films include Johnny Frenchman (1945), The White Unicorn (1947), La Forteresse (1947),
Sleeping Car to Trieste (1948), Passport to Pimlico (1949), The Romantic Age (1949), The Reluctant Widow (1950), and Ti Coq (1953). He was also seen in the popular Quebec television series Les Belles Histoires des pays d'en haut.

Filmography

References

External links
 

1913 births
1976 deaths
Canadian male television actors
Canadian male film actors
Male actors from Montreal
20th-century Canadian male actors
Burials at Notre Dame des Neiges Cemetery